Transcendental Blues is the ninth studio album by Steve Earle, released in 2000. It features Sharon Shannon on the track "The Galway Girl".  The album was nominated for a Grammy in the Best Contemporary Folk Album category.

Track listing
All tracks written by Steve Earle

 "Transcendental Blues" – 4:13
 Steve Earle – guitars, harmonium, mini-Moog, vocals
 Dan Metz – bass
 Ron Vance – drums
 "Everyone's in Love with You" – 3:30
 Steve Earle – electric guitar, vocals
 David Steele – electric guitar
 Kelley Looney – bass
 Will Rigby – drums, percussion
 Tom Littlefield – vocals
 "Another Town" – 2:22
 Steve Earle – acoustic guitar, vocals
 David Steele – electric guitars
 Kelley Looney – bass
 Will Rigby – drums, percussion
 "I Can Wait" – 3:16
 Steve Earle – 12-string acoustic, vocals
 David Steele – electric guitar
 Kelley Looney – bass
 Will Rigby – drums, percussion
 Tom Littlefield – vocals
 "The Boy Who Never Cried" – 3:46
 Steve Earle – 12-string Guitar, harmonium, vocals
 David Steele – bouzouki
 Kelley Looney – bass
 Will Rigby – drums, percussion
 Strings arranged and conducted by Kristin Wilkinson and performed by The Love Sponge:
 Kristin Wilkinson – viola
 John Catchings – cello
 David Angell – violin
 David Davidson – violin
 "Steve's Last Ramble" – 3:38
 Steve Earle – acoustic guitar, harmonica, vocals
 Sharon Shannon – accordion
 Mary Shannon – banjo
 Liz Kane – fiddle
 Yvonne Kane – fiddle
 Jim Murray – gut string guitar
 Bill Wright – bouzouki
 David Steele – electric guitar
 James Blennerhassett – upright bass
 Noel Bridgeman – drums
 "The Galway Girl" – 3:05
 Steve Earle – mandolin, vocals
 Sharon Shannon – accordion
 Mary Shannon – banjo
 Liz Kane – fiddle
 Yvonne Kane – fiddle
 Jim Murray – guitar
 Bill Wright – bouzouki
 Dan Gillis – tin whistle
 James Blennerhassett – upright bass
 Joyce Redmond – bodhran
 Noel Bridgeman – drums
 "Lonelier Than This" – 3:11
 Steve Earle – acoustic guitar, vocals
 David Steele – resonator guitar
 Kelley Looney – bass
 Ray Kennedy – electric guitar
 Will Rigby – drums, percussion
 "Wherever I Go" – 1:57
 Steve Earle – electric guitar, acoustic guitar, vocals
 David Steele – electric 12-string guitar
 Benmont Tench – organ, piano
 Kelley Looney – bass
 Will Rigby – drums
 "When I Fall" – 4:34
 Steve Earle – acoustic guitar, harmonica, vocals
 Stacey Earle – vocals
 Doug Lancio – electric guitars
 Ray Kennedy – bass
 Patrick Earle – drums, percussion
 "I Don't Want to Lose You Yet" – 3:22
 Steve Earle – acoustic guitar, vocals
 David Steele – electric guitars
 Benmont Tench – organ
 Kelley Looney – bass
 Will Rigby – drums, percussion
 Tom Littlefield – vocals
 "Halo 'Round the Moon" – 2:13
 Steve Earle – resonator guitar, harmonium, vocals
 David Steele – resonator guitar
 Kelley Looney – bass
 Will Rigby – drums, percussion
 "Until the Day I Die" – 3:22
 Steve Earle – guitar, vocals
 Tim O'Brien – mandolin, vocals
 Darrell Scott – banjo, vocals
 Casey Driessen – fiddle
 Dennis Crouch – upright bass
 "All My Life" – 3:27
 Steve Earle – guitars, harmonium, vocals
 Ray Kennedy – bass
 Patrick Earle – drums, percussion
 "Over Yonder (Jonathan's Song)" – 3:51
 Steve Earle – acoustic guitar, harmonica, vocals
 David Steele – mandola
 Kelley Looney – bass
 Will Rigby – drums, percussion

Personnel
 David Angell - violin
 James Blennerhassett - double bass
 Noel Bridgeman - drums
 David Davidson - violin
 John Catchings - cello
 Dennis Crouch - double bass
 Casey Driessen - fiddle
 Patrick Earle - drums, percussion 
 Dan Gillis - tin whistle
 Liz Kane - fiddle
 Yvonne Kane - fiddle
 Ray Kennedy - electric guitar, bass
 Doug Lancio - electric guitar
 Kelley Looney - bass
 Dan Metz - bass
 Jim Murray - gut string guitar
 Will Rigby - drums, percussion
 Tim O'Brien - vocals, mandolin
 Joyce Redmond - bodhrán
 Darrell Scott - vocals, banjo
 Mary Shannon - banjo
 Sharon Shannon - accordion
 David Steele - electric guitar, bouzouki
 Benmont Tench - piano, organ
 Ron Vance - drums
 Kristin Wilkinson - viola
 Bill Wright - bouzouki
 Steve Earle - vocals, guitar, harmonium, harmonica, synthesizer, mandolin
 Tony Fitzpatrick - Album Artwork

Chart performance

References

Steve Earle albums
2000 albums